Pentaborane may refer to:

Pentaborane(9) (B5H9)
Pentaborane(11) (B5H11)